Jean Marc Gaspard Itard (24 April 1774, Oraison, Alpes-de-Haute-Provence – 5 July 1838, Paris) was a French physician born in Provence. He is perhaps best known for his work with Victor of Aveyron.

Biography 
Itard, without a university education and working at a bank, was forced to enter the army during the French Revolution, but presented himself as a physician at that time.  After successfully working as an assistant physician at a military hospital in Soliers, in 1796, he was appointed deputy surgeon at Val-de-Grâce (Hôpital d'instruction des armées du Val-de-Grâce) military hospital in Paris, and in 1799, physician at the National Institution for Deaf Mutes.

René Laennec 
In Paris, Itard was a student of distinguished physician René Laennec, inventor of the stethoscope (in 1816). Laennec was a few years younger but had a formal education at the university at Nantes and later became a lecturer and professor of medicine at the Collège de France. Itard described pneumothorax in 1803; Laennec would provide a fuller description of the condition in 1819.

Other works 
In 1821, Itard published a major work on otology, describing the results of his medical research based on over 170 detailed cases.  He is credited with the invention of a Eustachian catheter that is referred to as "Itard's catheter".  Numbness in the tympanic membrane during otosclerosis has the eponymous name of "Itard-Cholewa Symptom".

In 1825, as the head physician at the Institution Royale des sourds-muets, Itard was credited with describing the first case of Tourette syndrome in Marquise de Dampierre, a woman of nobility.

On 5 July 1838, at the age of 64, Jean Marc Gaspard Itard died in Paris, France.

Work on Victor of Aveyron 
He is known as an educator of the deaf, and tried his educational theories in the celebrated case of Victor of Aveyron, dramatized in the 1970 motion picture The Wild Child directed by François Truffaut, who also played Itard. However, he was disappointed with the progress he made with Victor. Itard was known to conduct experiments on the deaf students of the Institution Nationale des Sourds-Muets à Paris in useless attempts to restore their hearing, including delivering electrical shocks, leech therapy, ear surgeries, and various types of internal and external medicinal applications.

Works

Notes

External links
 
 

1774 births
1838 deaths
People from Alpes-de-Haute-Provence
Tourette syndrome
19th-century French physicians
18th-century French physicians
Educators of the deaf